Xaverian Brothers High School (XBHS) was founded in 1963 by the Xaverian Brothers. It is a private, Catholic secondary school for boys at grades 7 to 12. Located within a  campus in Westwood, Massachusetts. It is located in the Roman Catholic Archdiocese of Boston.  Xaverian is sponsored by the Xaverian Brothers religious order and offers a college preparatory program. The school attracts students from more than 60 communities in eastern Massachusetts and Rhode Island.

History and tradition

The Xaverian Brothers established the school in its current location in Westwood, Massachusetts in 1963 with the support of Cardinal Richard Cushing, the Archbishop of Boston. Cardinal Cushing officiated the school's dedication ceremony on August 31, 1963, with Xaverian Brothers' provincial Brother Gilroy Bishop, and the first headmaster, Brother Marcellus Feeley. The land that the school stands on today was originally part of the Forbes family estate. The late philanthropist Rocco Zoppo was instrumental in arranging for the Brothers to receive the land. The school's Rocco Zoppo Chapter of the National Honor Society is now named in his honor. The first day of school at XBHS was September 5, 1963 with 251 students, all ninth graders.

Academics

XBHS is a Catholic college preparatory school for boys in grades 7-12. The school is a Xaverian Brothers Sponsored School that enrolls 880 students from more than 60 different communities. 

There are Academic Department Centers for Mathematics, English, Social Studies, World Languages, Theology, and three science labs (Biology, Chemistry and Physics).

In 2014, the Francis Xavier Division (grades 7 and 8) was established, bringing in the first-ever 7th grade class.

Athletics

XBHS is a member of the Catholic Conference and is classified as Division 1 in the Massachusetts Interscholastic Athletic Association (MIAA) for a majority of its athletic programs. It sponsors 16 varsity sports - cross country (non-cut), golf, football (non-cut) and soccer during the fall season; alpine skiing (non-cut), basketball, hockey, indoor track (non-cut), swimming (non-cut), and wrestling (non-cut) during the winter season; and baseball, lacrosse, rugby (non-cut), tennis, track & field (non-cut) and volleyball during the spring season. The MIAA has honored Xaverian athletics five times for outstanding sportsmanship.  Many Xaverian graduates go on to participate in college athletics and a few alumni are playing among the professional ranks in basketball, football and hockey including James Bailey '75 and Dana Barros '85 in the NBA; Greg Comella '93, Matt Hasselbeck '93, Tim Hasselbeck '96, Drew Strojny '99, Maurice Hurst Jr. '13, and Joe Gaziano '15 in the NFL; and Mark Young '77 in the AHL, and Chris Wagner '09 in the NHL. Ted Currle is the current Athletic Director.

Athletic success

The Hawks' most notable success in athletics has been in alpine skiing, baseball, cross country, golf, football, lacrosse and track & field.

In particular, the football team has brought great notoriety to the school, having won ten MIAA Division 1 State Championships in 1966, 1967, 1986, 1994, 1995, 1996, 1998, 2009, 2014 and 2015.  The 2015 team was ranked the 22nd best team in nation by USA Today.  Further, four Hawks' football players have been selected the Massachusetts Player of the Year by numerous organizations: Greg Comella in 1992, Matt Hasselbeck in 1993, Chris Fox in 2005, Alex Phalen in 2009, Joe Gaziano in 2014, and Coby Tippett in 2015.

In addition, the alpine ski team won the State Championship in 2013 and 2016.  The golf team won state titles in 2014 and 2016. The baseball team won the State Championship in 2004, 2012, and 2021 with the 2004 team ranked the 24th best team in the country by USA Today.  The cross country team won the State Championship in 1984.  The swimming and diving team won the State Championship in 1996.  The lacrosse team won the State Championship in 2013.  And in track & field, Derek Anderson '00 won the 1999 and 2000 All-State Discus and set the state record of 186-03; Chris Bonner '02 won the 2002 All-State 600m and set the state record of 1:20.11; and the 2006 outdoor track team won the MIAA All State Meet.

Campus ministry

As a Xaverian Brothers Sponsored School firmly rooted in the Catholic tradition, XBHS places a strong emphasis on Christian faith formation and Christian service, volunteer community service inspired by the teachings of Christ. Such faith formation and service takes place in two required and several other voluntary forms. All students are required to participate in the Freshman Day of Awareness, which introduces students to the Xaverian Christian Community, and the Sophomore Faith Experience, which is an off-campus retreat that builds upon the development of faith during the Freshman year.

XBHS offers students many other voluntary opportunities to take part in various Christian faith formation and service programs. The Xaverian Leadership Institute (XLI) is a five-day Servant Leadership retreat for Seniors which takes place during August.  The Xaverian Global Encounter program is an optional retreat/service experience that takes place during the April and Summer Vacations.  During the experience, students travel to marginalized areas to live, work and pray with established communities.  Past global encounter sites have included: Pine Ridge Indian Reservation in South Dakota, Rostro de Cristo Program in Duran, Ecuador, Los Ninos International in Tijuana, Mexico, Bethlehem Farm in Pence Springs, West Virginia and Camden, New Jersey. In addition, the Christian Senior Service Program is conducted during the last term of the Senior year. This five to six week program places seniors in approved social service agencies to complete full-time volunteer work for a minimum of 25 – 30 hours per week.

Clubs and activities

Theater Arts
XBHS's theatrical performances have been in existence since Xaverian first opened in the late 1960s. Since its first production, "Take Time Out" Xaverian has performed over 80 shows. XBHS presents a fall drama, a spring musical, and two sketch comedy shows and live music performances dubbed "Live @ the X". The artistic director for productions is Julianne O'Connor and the production manager is Paula Duddy.

Performance History:

Notable alumni
XBHS has approximately 10,000 alumni living all around the globe. Notable alumni distinguishing themselves include:
Gerard Alessandrini (1972) - Tony Award-winning playwright and creator of Forbidden Broadway and Spamilton
Brendan Burke (2006) - LGBT activist
Dennis Crowley (1994) - co-founder and Executive Chairman of Foursquare 
Jimmy Cummings (1986) - actor and screenwriter of Southie
Christopher F. Egan (1982) - United States Ambassador to the Organisation for Economic Co-operation and Development
Ted English (1971) - Executive Chairman of Bob's Discount Furniture and former CEO of TJX Companies 
John Ennis (1982) - actor and comedian best known for role on HBO's Mr. Show with Bob and David
Rob Mariano (1994) - TV personality known as "Boston Rob"
Steven McLaughlin - County Executive of Rensselaer County
John J. Sullivan (1977) - United States Ambassador to Russia
William F. Sullivan (1975) - Associate Justice of Massachusetts Superior Courts
Ed Thomas (1971) - President and CEO of Tillys
Pat Walsh (1998) - co-founder & Chief Impact Officer of Classy
Joe Mulherin (1994) - musician

Notable alumni distinguishing themselves in athletics include:
James Bailey (1975) - former National Basketball Association player
Dana Barros (1985) - former National Basketball Association All-Star player
Greg Comella (1993) - former National Football League player
John Delaney (2004) - head baseball coach, Quinnipiac University
Joe Fleming (1992) - former Canadian Football League All-Star player
Joe Gaziano (2015) - National Football League player, Northwestern University football all-time sacks leader
Matt Hasselbeck (1993) - former National Football League All-Pro player and ESPN analyst
Tim Hasselbeck (1996) - former National Football League player and ESPN analyst
Maurice Hurst Jr. (2013) - National Football League player
Mark Jackson (1991) - athletic director, Villanova University
Matt Klentak (1998) - general manager, Philadelphia Phillies 
Brian Mann (1998) - athletic director, William & Mary; Dartmouth College football single season passing yards leader
Tim Scannell (1986) - head baseball coach, Trinity University (TX); 2016 DIII National Champion and Coach of the Year 
Drew Strojny (1999) - former National Football League player
Chris Wagner (2009) - current National Hockey League player

References

External links

 Xaverian Brothers High School website

Boys' schools in Massachusetts
Catholic secondary schools in Massachusetts
Schools in Norfolk County, Massachusetts
Schools sponsored by the Xaverian Brothers
Educational institutions established in 1963
1963 establishments in Massachusetts
Catholic Conference (MIAA)
Westwood, Massachusetts